Minnesota's 1st congressional district extends across southern Minnesota from the border with South Dakota to the border with Wisconsin. It is a primarily rural district built on a strong history of agriculture, though this is changing rapidly due to strong population growth in the Rochester combined statistical area. The district is also home to several of Minnesota's major mid-sized cities, including Rochester, Mankato, Winona, Austin, Owatonna, Albert Lea, New Ulm, and Worthington. It is represented by Republican Brad Finstad.

From early statehood until after the 2000 census, the district covered only southeast Minnesota. During the 20th century, it was generally considered solidly Republican, but it became more of a swing district in the late 20th to early 21st century. In 2004, John Kerry received 47% of the vote in the district. In 2006, Republican Representative Gil Gutknecht lost to Democrat Tim Walz. In March 2017, Walz announced that he would not run for reelection to Congress, and instead would run for governor of Minnesota. On paper, the district leans Republican, with a CPVI of R+8, but some recent elections have been among the closest in the nation, won by less than a single percentage point in both 2016 and 2018. In the 2022 general election, Republican Brad Finstad defeated the Democratic nominee by 11.5 points. His margin of victory was the largest of any candidate in the district since 2012 and the best showing for a Republican since 2004.

Election results from statewide races

List of members representing the district

Recent elections

See also

List of United States congressional districts
Minnesota's congressional districts

References

01